Phenacomargarites is a genus of sea snails, marine gastropod mollusks, in the subfamily Fautricinae of the family Calliostomatidae within the superfamily Trochoidea, the top snails, turban snails and their allies.

Species
Species within the genus Phenacomargarites include:
 Phenacomargarites incomptus B. A. Marshall, 2016
 Phenacomargarites titan B. A. Marshall, 2016
 Phenacomargarites williamsae B. A. Marshall, 2016

References

Calliostomatidae